Zhang Xuezhong (born February 1943) is a Chinese politician and a deputy to the National People's Congress. He has held important party positions in the provinces including the vice-governor of Gansu and the Party Committee Secretary of Sichuan Province. He has also held the post of the Minister of Human Resources and Social Security in the central government. Zhang is considered an ally of the former General Secretary of the Chinese Communist Party (CCP) Hu Jintao.

Career 
Zhang Xuezhong was born in February 1943 in Lanzhou, Gansu Province. He graduated from both the Northwest Normal University (1961) and  Lanzhou University (1966)  majoring in Chinese language and literature. Zhang subsequently worked as a primary school teacher. He joined the CCP in December 1960. For much of his initial career he taught at the Lanzhou Teachers' School but in 1990 he assumed provincial party and military posts. Zhang studied at the Central Party School between 1990 and 1994. In 1994 he transferred to Beijing and soon became the Minister of Human Resources and Social Security.

Zhang is considered an ally of Hu Jintao, the former General Secretary of the CCP. Zhang got to know Hu when he worked as a personal secretary of Song Ping, former party secretary of Gansu Province. Zhang's connection with Hu put him in a difficult position when farmers in Hanyuan County, Sichuan Province protested the central government's refusal to allow farmers more political rights. The hotel where Zhang was staying was surrounded and the police clashed with the demonstrators resulting in ten casualties. His current position as the party secretary of Sichuan, too, is seen as Hu's project to raise his status before he is potentially given more important promotions.

Zhang was the chairman of the Standing Committee of the Sichuan Provincial Committee from 2003 to 2006 and secretary of the Sichuan Party Committee from 2002 to 2006. He is a deputy to the National People's Congress representing Sichuan Province. Zhang is also a member of the 16th Central Committee of the CPC and an alternate member of its Politburo.

Throughout his career, Zhang has held the following posts:
 Secretary of General Office of the CPC Provincial Committee of Gansu Province, 1964–1977
 Secretary of the Revolutionary Committee of the Production office in Gansu Province, 1964–1977
 Secretary of the Corps Command Office of the Lanzhou Military Region of the People's Liberation Army; 1977–1978, 1979–1980
 Secretary of the CPC Fafang People's Commune, Wuwei County, 1978–1979
 Secretary of the CPC County Committee of Yuzhong County, Gansu Province, 1980–1983
 Deputy-secretary of the CPC City Committee of Lanzhou City, Gansu Province, 1983–1985
 Secretary of the CPC Prefectural Committee of Longnan, Gansu Province, 1985–1989
 Vice-governor of the People's Government of Gansu Province, 1989–1990
 Deputy secretary of the CPC Autonomous Prefectural Committee of the Tibet Autonomous Region, 1990–1994
 Vice-minister of Human Resources and Social Security, 1994–2000
 Member of the Central Work Committee of Large Enterprises of the Central Committee of the CPC, 1998–1999
 Minister of Human Resources and Social Security, 2000–2002
 Secretary of the CPC Provincial Committee of Sichuan Province, 2002–2006
 Member of the 16th Central Committee of the CPC, 2002–2007
 Chairman of the Standing Committee of the Provincial People's Congress of Sichuan Province, 2003–2006
 Deputy-director of the 10th Internal and Judicial Affairs Committee of the National People's Congress, 2006

See also 

 Politics of China
 Politics of Gansu
 Politics of Sichuan

References

Sources

External links 
 Zhang Xuezhong at China.org.cn

1943 births
Living people
Chinese Communist Party politicians from Gansu
Political office-holders in Sichuan
Northwest Normal University alumni
Lanzhou University alumni
Members of the Standing Committee of the 11th National People's Congress
Members of the 16th Central Committee of the Chinese Communist Party